Conviction is the second and final studio album by American heavy metal band The Crimson Armada. The album was released on June 21, 2011, through Artery Recordings. It is the only one of their releases to include clean vocals. It is the only album to feature vocalist/guitarist Brandon McMaster.

Track listing

Personnel
Credits for Conviction adapted from Allmusic.
The Crimson Armada
Saud Ahmed – Lead vocals, keyboards, synthesizers, piano, programming, guitars
Brandon McMaster – Lead guitar, clean vocals
Dan Hatfield – Rhythm guitar
Chris Yates – Bass
Jordan Matz – Drums, percussion

Additional Musicians
 Andy Atkins (A Plea for Purging) - Guest Vocals on track 4
 Levi Benton (Miss May I) - Guest Vocals on track 6

Production
Produced by Brian Hood & Saud Ahmed
Engineered, Mixed, Mastered & additional instruments by Brian Hood
Composed by The Crimson Armada
Management by Thomas Gutches (The Artery Foundation)
A&R & layout by Mike Milford

References

2011 albums
The Crimson Armada albums
Artery Recordings albums